Mikalai Kamianchuk (born 9 August 1987) is a Belarusian pair skater. He has placed in the top ten at four European Championships, skating with Lubov Bakirova and Tatiana Danilova.

Career

Early career 

Kamianchuk began learning to skate in 1992. He switched from singles to pairs when he was 16 years old.

Kamianchuk teamed up with Russia's Lubov Bakirova in 2009. Appearing at six ISU Championships, the two achieved their best result, 10th, at the 2011 Europeans in Bern and the 2012 Europeans in Sheffield. They competed together until the end of the 2011−12 season.

Partnership with Danilova 
Kamianchuk returned to competition in 2014–15, partnered with Russia's Tatiana Danilova. Making their debut as a pair, they placed 6th at the CS Golden Spin of Zagreb in December 2014. They won the silver medal at the Toruń Cup in January 2015. They were second at the Belarusian Championships behind Maria Paliakova / Nikita Bochkov.

Danilova/Kamianchuk finished 10th at the 2016 European Championships in Bratislava and 20th at the 2016 World Championships in Boston, coached by Dmitri Kaplun in Minsk.

The pair placed 10th at the 2017 European Championships in Ostrava. They placed 23rd at the 2017 World Championships in Helsinki.

Programs

With Danilova

With Bakirova

Competitive highlights 
CS: Challenger Series

With Danilova

With Bakirova

References

External links 

 
 

Belarusian male pair skaters
1987 births
Living people
Figure skaters from Minsk